Alma Jannon Roland (born February 3, 1975) (better known as Jannon Roland) is a former professional basketball player who played for the Orlando Miracle of the WNBA.

College
Roland was a member of the Big Ten Conference championship teams in 1994, 1995, and 1997. She returned to Purdue in 2003 to complete her degree in organization leadership and supervision.

Purdue statistics
Source

Honors and awards
Second team All-America honors from USA Today and Parade magazine
1993 Division II Player of the Year
1997 Big Ten player of the year
2x Division II state championshion (1992, 1993)
Inducted into Ohio Basketball Hall of Fame

References

External links
MIRACLE: Building The Miracle
PURDUESPORTS.COM - Jannon Roland Bio - Purdue University Official Athletic Site

1975 births
Living people
American women's basketball coaches
Basketball players from Ohio
Forwards (basketball)
Guards (basketball)
New England Blizzard players
Orlando Miracle players
Purdue Boilermakers women's basketball coaches
Purdue Boilermakers women's basketball players
People from Urbana, Ohio
Sportspeople from Springfield, Ohio
Columbus Quest players